Kunwarara is a rural locality in the Livingstone Shire, Queensland, Australia. In the  Kunwarara had a population of 71 people.

Geography 
The North Coast railway line forms part of the southern boundary of the locality with Canoona and then passes through the south-west of locality exiting to Marlborough.

Merimal is a neighbourhood within the locality. It takes its name from the now-abandoned Merimal railway station on the North Coast railway line. Merimal Park (pastoral property) takes its name from the abandoned railway station and locality.

Princhester is an abandoned town in the locality. It takes its name from the former pastoral run established in 1857 by Dan Connor. Princhester railway siding is to the north of the town on the North Coast railway line.

Despite its name Kunwarara railway station is now located within the boundaries of Canoona to the south.

The Magog Range is in the north-west of the locality  extending into neighbouring Marlborough. It includes a number of peaks within the locality (from north to south):

The Pointer Range forms part of south-eastern boundary of Kunwarara separating it from Canal Creek. The range extends south into Canoona.

History 
The Princhester pastoral run was established in 1857 by Dan Connor. By 1860 a Native Police barracks was constructed at Princhester under Sub-Lieutenant Walter Powell. The first town lots in Princhester were sold in June 1862. There was a gold rush at Princhester in 1883. However, it did not produce very much gold. From time to time, further small finds were made prompting more "rushes", but it was not a great gold producing area particularly compared with the success of Mount Morgan.

The section of the North Coast railway lines from Yaamba to Kunwarara was opened in August 1915. The next section of the North Coast railway line from Kunwarara to Marlborough was officially opened on Saturday 31 March 1917 by Herbert Hardacre, the Queensland Minister for Public Instruction. Although Kunwarara railway station remains officially an operational station, in 1994 the station building was relocated to the Australian Workers Heritage Museum in Barcaldine.

In the  Kunwarara had a population of 71 people.

Economy 
There are a number of homesteads in the locality:

 Balmoral
 Eden Garry
 Grosvenor Park
Merimal Park

Education 
There are no schools in Kunwarara. The nearest primary schools are Marlborough State School in neighbouring Marlborough to the west and Milman State School in Milman to the south-east. The nearest secondary school is Glenmore State High School in Kawana in Rockhampton to the south.

References

External links 

 

Shire of Livingstone
Localities in Queensland